François-Isidore Gagelin (10 May 1799 – 17 October 1833) was a French missionary of the Paris Foreign Missions Society in Vietnam. He died a martyr, and became the first French martyr of the 19th century in Vietnam. He was born in Montperreux, Doubs. He left for Vietnam in 1821. In 1826, when Emperor Minh Mạng ordered all missionaries to gather at the capital Huế, he fled to the south to Đồng Nai in Cochinchina. He was captured once and released.

On 6 January 1833, a new edict of prohibition was promulgated by Minh Mạng and immediately put in application. Churches were destroyed, and missionaries had to live in hiding. Gagelin surrendered in August 1833, and he was brought to Huế. He was killed by strangulation on 17 October 1833, which is the date of his feast.

He was beatified in 1900, and canonized in 1988 by Pope John Paul II.

Notes

External links
 Archives of the Paris Foreign Missions Society 

Paris Foreign Missions Society missionaries
19th-century executions by Vietnam
1833 in Vietnam
1799 births
1833 deaths
French Roman Catholic saints
Vietnamese Roman Catholic saints
People executed by strangulation
French people executed abroad
People from Doubs
Executed people from Franche-Comté
French expatriates in Vietnam
Roman Catholic missionaries in Vietnam